Thal Abergel (born 13 October 1982) is a French chess Grandmaster (2008).

In November 2003 when an International master, Abergel won his first 4NCL game in 15 moves.

Thal became a Grandmaster in 2008.

References

External links 
Profile and statistics, Chessgames.com
Photographs at 4NCL, 2003/4 season

1982 births
Chess grandmasters
Living people
21st-century French Jews
French people of Moroccan-Jewish descent